Helge Liljebjörn (16 August 1904 – 2 May 1952) was a Swedish football midfielder who played for the Swedish national football team. He was a reserve in the 1934 FIFA World Cup. He also played for GAIS.

References

1904 births
1952 deaths
Swedish footballers
Sweden international footballers
Association football midfielders
GAIS players
Allsvenskan players
1934 FIFA World Cup players
Swedish football managers
GAIS managers